Il Conte di Matera ("The Count of Matera") is a 1958 Italian adventure film directed  by Luigi Capuano and starring Virna Lisi and Otello Toso.

Plot 
Rambaldo Tramontana, a count who went into battle backed by the French, returns to Matera to take revenge once he is victorious, but the city is deserted and he begins to commit abuses and violence. Filiberto, his perfidious squire, thinks he can marry his daughter, Greta. She discovers that Paolo, the son of Duke Bresci, is not dead as wrongly communicated; she falls in love with him while the young man vows to avenge his father, forced into exile by Count Tramontana, and will try to free his daughter, Gisella, engaged to Count Mario Del Balzo. Paolo, aided by many reinforcements, manages to conquer Matera while both Rambaldo and Filiberto will be killed after a bloody sword fight. Once the city is liberated, two weddings will be celebrated.

Cast
 
 Otello Toso as  Rambaldo Tramontana, Count of Matera
 Virna Lisi as Greta Tramontana
 Giacomo Rossi Stuart as Duke Paolo Bressi
 Paul Müller as  Filiberto 
  Eva Vanicek as  Marquisse Taldi
 Aldo Bufi Landi as  Count Mario Del Balzo
 Wandisa Guida as  Gisella Bressi
  Emilio Petacci as   Duke  Bressi
 Guido Celano as   Giacomo
 Nietta Zocchi as  Greta's Housekeeper
 Armando Migliari as  Antonio
  Bruna Cealti as  Giacomo's Wife
  Pasquale De Filippo as  Alfredo
 Renato Chiantoni as  Rambaldo's Henchman
 Pietro De Vico as  Golia
 Erminio Spalla as Golia's 's Henchman
 Carlo Tamberlani as The architect
  Edoardo Toniolo as  Count Ruggi
 Nerio Bernardi as Marquis Taldi
 Nazzareno Zamperla as  Marco
 Elena Sedlak as The Ballerina
  Ugo Sasso as The Messenger 
 Corrado Annicelli as The Spy
 Amedeo Trilli as   Greta's Escort Soldier

References

External links

Italian adventure films
Italian swashbuckler films
1958 adventure films
1958 films
Films directed by Luigi Capuano
Films set in Basilicata
Films set in the 16th century
Italian black-and-white films
1950s Italian films